Places with Philipsburg in the name in the state of Pennsylvania:
Philipsburg, Centre County, Pennsylvania
North Philipsburg, Pennsylvania
South Philipsburg, Pennsylvania
 The borough of Monaca, Pennsylvania was first incorporated as Phillipsburg in 1840